Germans in Jamaica or German Jamaicans, are Jamaicans of German ancestry. The population was established in the 1830s when the abolition of slavery resulted in a labour shortage on the Caribbean island. Lord Seaford, who owned the Montpelier Estate and Shettlewood Pen in St. James established a European settlement in Westmoreland in order to combat the shortage, and over one thousand Germans migrated to Jamaica.

The German language is no longer used on the island, but some German words have entered the Jamaican vernacular. Many Jamaicans in Seaford and German Town in Westmoreland carry heavy European features such as blue eyes, blond hair, freckles and white skin, as a result of the German genetic influences.

Notable people

 Supa Dups
 Sharlene Radlein
 Julian Radlein
 George Stiebel
 Thomas J. Goreau, biogeochemist and marine biologist
 Herbert Eldemire, politician

References

German Caribbean
Jamaica
Ethnic groups in Jamaica
European Jamaican
Jamaica